Ander Barrenetxea Muguruza (born 27 December 2001) is a Spanish professional footballer who plays for Real Sociedad as a forward or left winger.

Club career
Born in San Sebastián, Gipuzkoa, Basque Country, Barrenetxea is a graduate of Real Sociedad's youth setup.

In the 2018–19 season, he began to become involved in training with the senior team, while registered with the club's C-team playing in the amateur fourth tier. In early December 2018, he renewed his contract until 2025.

On 22 December 2018, Barrenetxea made his professional and La Liga debut as a late substitute for Real Sociedad in a 1–0 home loss against Deportivo Alavés. In so doing, he became the first player born in the 21st century to appear in the competition, the 26th-youngest debutant in the division overall, and the club's youngest since the Spanish Civil War (behind only 15-year-old Pedro Irastorza in 1934). By coincidence, the player who left the field, Juanmi, was even younger when making his bow in the competition eight years earlier.

Barrenetxea's rapid progression to the senior team made him the first youth product to appear at that level without already playing for the club's B-team, known as Sanse, since Antoine Griezmann did likewise in 2009. Two days after his breakthrough, he was back playing with the C-team.

Barrenetxea made his debut for Sanse on 6 January 2019, scoring on his debut in the third tier in a 3–0 home victory over CD Izarra. He scored his first professional goal for the first team on 12 May, in a 3–1 home victory over Real Madrid CF.

On 9 June 2019, Barrenetxea was definitely promoted to the main squad of the Txuri-urdin.

International career
Barrenetxea was called up for the Spain Under-16 team in 2016 and 2017, and appeared for the Under-18s in November 2018. He also featured for the regional Basque Country in the same age groups.

He was selected for the 20-man Spain squad for the 2019 UEFA European Under-19 Championship, and came on as an 80th-minute substitute as Spain beat Portugal 2–0 in the final to be crowned winners of the competition.

Career statistics

Club

Honours

Club 
Real Sociedad
 Copa del Rey: 2019–20

International
Spain U19
UEFA European Under-19 Championship: Champion 2019

References

External links
Profile at the Real Sociedad website

2001 births
Living people
Footballers from San Sebastián
Spanish footballers
Association football forwards
Association football wingers
La Liga players
Tercera División players
Segunda División B players
Antiguoko players
Real Sociedad footballers
Real Sociedad B footballers
Real Sociedad C footballers
Spain youth international footballers
Spain under-21 international footballers